Wadie Township is a township in Yuanjiang Hani, Yi and Dai Autonomous County, Yunnan, China.

Etymology
Wadie was named after Bai Wadie, an official in late Ming (1368–1644) and early Qing dynasty (1644–1911).

Administrative division
As of 2016, the township is divided into one community and six villages: 
 Wadie Community
 Tajike
 Laochaji
 Yicibei
 Luodie
 Tacaiji
 Nibai

Geography
It lies at the southeastern of Yuanjiang Hani, Yi and Dai Autonomous County, bordering Lijiang Subdistrict and Honghe County to the southwest, Longtan Township to the north, and Shiping County to the east.

The Xiaohedi River flows through the township south to north.

The township has five reservoirs, including Podie Reservoir and Wayaochong Reservoir.

Economy
The principal industries in the area are agriculture, forestry and animal husbandry. Significant crops include rice, wheat, corn, and bean. Economic crops are mainly sugarcane, tobacco, and rape.

Transportation
The Provincial Highway S212 winds through the township.

References

Bibliography

Divisions of Yuanjiang Hani, Yi and Dai Autonomous County